Oxidation resistance protein 1 is a protein that in humans is encoded by the OXR1 gene.

References

Further reading